Continental Circus is the original soundtrack album of the 1972 French documentary film of the same name directed by Jérôme Laperrousaz.  Released in April 1972 on Philips Records, the album is credited to "Gong avec Daevid Allen" and was recorded and mixed in two days in the spring of 1971, a few months before the band's 1971 album Camembert Electrique was made. Laperrousaz was a close friend and supporter of Allen and his partner Gilli Smyth and the film, starring Jack Findlay and Giacomo Agostini, is about motorcycle road racing.

The track "What Do You Want?" is the same piece as "Fohat Digs Holes in Space" on Camembert Electrique, but the version here lacks the intro, has different lyrics and is played slightly slower. The track entitled "Continental Circus World" consists of dialogue and sound effects from the film, backed with a looped excerpt from "Blues for Findlay", the album's only new composition.

The album features English drummer Pip Pyle who had recently joined the band, having been introduced to Daevid Allen by Robert Wyatt during the recording of Allen's debut solo album, Banana Moon, in February.

Track listing 

For legal reasons, Allen gave his writing credits on the album to his partner Gilli Smyth. He also did this for Magick Brother & a few other releases.

Various bootleg versions of the album exist on CD which include live and studio tracks from roughly the same period.

Personnel
 Daevid Allen – guitar, vocals
 Gilli Smyth – space whisper
 Didier Malherbe – saxophone, flute
 Christian Tritsch – bass
 Pip Pyle – drums

References

Documentary film soundtracks
Gong (band) albums
1972 soundtrack albums
Progressive rock albums by British artists
Progressive rock soundtracks